D site of albumin promoter (albumin D-box) binding protein, also known as DBP, is a protein which in humans is encoded by the DBP gene.

DBP is a member of the PAR bZIP (Proline and Acidic amino acid-Rich basic leucine ZIPper) transcription factor family.
DBP binds to an upstream promoter in the insulin gene.

References

Further reading

External links 
 

Transcription factors